Andriy Mykhaylovych Khomyn (born 2 January 1982) is a Ukrainian retired footballer.

External links 
 

1982 births
Living people
Ukrainian footballers
Association football defenders
FC Borysfen Boryspil players
FC Arsenal Kyiv players
FC Metalist Kharkiv players
FC Hoverla Uzhhorod players
Footballers from Kyiv